The Raid on Sidi Haneish Airfield was a military operation carried out the night of 26 July 1942. A British Special Air Service unit commanded by Major David Stirling attacked a German-held airfield in Egypt during the Western Desert Campaign of Second World War. Several  aircraft used to ferry supplies to the Axis forces were destroyed or damaged with machine-gun fire and explosives. Axis front line units were diverted to reinforce the garrisons in the rear vulnerable to attack.

Background

Axis supply

In November 1941, 70% of supplies being sent to Axis forces in North Africa were lost to Allied air and naval attacks. By 1942, German and Italian forces in North Africa faced a serious supply shortage with Allied forces sinking merchant ships in the Mediterranean Sea. Axis supplies were being transported down the Italian Peninsula, mainly by rail, to southern ports for shipment to North Africa. The terrain in North Africa often made land transport impractical, forcing aircraft to fly between remote desert airstrips to deliver supplies, parts, troops and food.

Special Air Service

In July 1941, Major David Stirling formed the Special Air Service for bold operations behind Axis lines. Initially dubbed 'L' Detachment, Special Air Service Brigade, the unit consisted of men drawn from conventional British units and given ad hoc parachute training. The unit was based in Jalo Oasis and gained a reputation for daring raids on German bases, infiltrating them and destroying parked aircraft with explosives. Stirling became known among the Germans as the "Phantom Major".

Prelude

The raid was to involve a tactic unfamiliar to the SAS; storming the base in vehicles, rather than discreetly penetrating it. He enlisted the Long Range Desert Group to provide vehicles and transport, judging the firepower and speed of the jeeps to be sufficient to overcome the German defences. Each jeep carried four Vickers K machine guns, a rapid-firing weapon, originally designed for Royal Air Force (RAF) aircraft. On the night of 25/26 July, the men held a dress rehearsal.

Raid

The raid commenced on the night of 26/27 July, with the 18 jeeps, each carrying three or four British or French commandos, navigating the desert in formation without headlights. The weather was ideal with a full moon and no clouds. As the raiders approached the airfield, the lights lining the runway switched on, causing concern among the commandos who feared they had been detected but the lights had been turned on for a  bomber to land. Stirling fired a green flare and ordered the jeeps forward onto the airfield in 'V' formation. The SAS stormed the airfield, using their K guns, loaded with tracer ammunition, to fire on the parked German aircraft which included Junkers Ju 87  dive bombers, Ju 52 cargo aircraft and Messerschmitt Bf 109 fighters. German troops retaliated with machine-guns and anti-aircraft weapons, disabling one jeep. Lance Bombardier John Robson, a 21-year-old SAS soldier manning a machine-gun, was shot and killed, the only Allied casualty of the raid itself. The raiders used most of their ammunition and manoeuvred to escape after a last sweep for undamaged aircraft. Paddy Mayne placed a bomb in the engine of a parked bomber before withdrawing. The raiders destroyed or damaged around 40  aircraft, though the SAS claimed 25 as it was customary to under-report Axis losses.

Escape

The raiders escaped into the desert, less one jeep and one man killed and split into groups of three to five jeeps, seeking to evade detection by German aircraft since only two and a half hours of darkness remained; in daylight, they would become vulnerable to air attack. The SAS hid during the day, camouflaging their vehicles and all but one group reached . A group of jeeps operated by French troops were slowed by punctures and breakdowns, exposing them in the desert. They were spotted by four  dive-bombers which made nine attacks, fatally wounding paratrooper André Zirnheld. After the  ran out of ammunition, the commandos boarded the last operational jeep and reached safety.

Aftermath

The raid was a great success, several of the destroyed German aircraft being Junkers 52 transport aircraft, loss of which exacerbated Axis supply difficulties.

Stirling himself was captured by the Germans in January 1943 and spent the rest of the war in and out of Axis prisoner of war camps. He was replaced by Mayne as commander of the SAS.

See also
 Raid on Bardia
 Operation Caravan
 Long Range Desert Group
 Desert warfare
 List of North African airfields during World War II

Footnotes

References

 
 
 
 
 
 
 
 
 
 
 
 
 

Sidi Haneish Airfield
July 1942 events
1942 in Egypt
Sidi Haneish Airfield
Sidi Haneish Airfield
Egypt in World War II
Sidi Haneish Airfield
North African campaign
Western Desert campaign